Chitipa District is the northernmost district in the Northern Region of Malawi. The capital is Chitipa (formerly known as Fort Hill). The district covers an area of 4,288 km.², and has a population of 234,927.  Chitipa borders fellow districts Karonga and Rumphi, as well as neighboring countries Tanzania and Zambia.
The district is divided into five main areas known as Misuku to the east, Kameme to the north, Bulambia right at the centre while Wenya and Nthalire areas are situated to the south.

Government and administrative divisions

There are five National Assembly constituencies in Chitipa:

 Chitipa - Central
 Chitipa - East
 Chitipa - North
 Chitipa - South
 Chitipa - Wenya

Since the 2009 election all of these constituencies have been held by members of the Democratic Progressive Party.
ARMS OF CHITIPA DISTRICT COUNCIL
The district has two arms of government: (the political arm and administrative arm.
Political arm headed by elected council chairperson,(Isaac Mwepa -2014 to date
The administrative arm headed by District commissioner
The District has ten elected councillors, 1, Isaac Mwepa who is also the council chairperson 2.Newton Sibale 3.James Ng"ambi 4.Maxwell Kayira 5.Christopher Munyenyembe 6.Chitatata Chunda 7.Ginilon Mulungu 8.Davie Silwimba 9.Osman Kanyika 10.Ambokire Chiona.
Isaac Mwepa is the only youthful elected councillor in the chamber.

Demographics

Ethnic groups
At the time of the 2018 Census of Malawi, the distribution of the population of Chitipa District by ethnic group was as follows:
 30.4% Lambya
 24.5% Tumbuka
 15.4% Sukwa
 1.1% Chewa
 0.5% Nkhonde
 0.3% Ngoni
 0.1% Tonga
 0.1% Lomwe
 0.1% Yao
 0.1% Nyanja
 0.0% Mang'anja
 0.0% Sena
 27.5% Others

Languages
A number of different languages or dialects spoken in the district. According to a language survey carried out in 2006 by the University of Malawi, the principal languages spoken are as follows (the spelling Ci- is also found):
Chindali / Chisukwa / Chilambya
Chinamwanga / Chimambwe / Chiwandya
Chinyiha / Chinyika
Chibemba
Chitumbuka

The first three groups are fairly close, and are all classified as belonging to zone M in the Guthrie classification of Bantu languages  (specifically to the Rukwa language group). Chibemba is also classified in zone M, but in a different group, while Chitumbuka is a little more distant and is classified as belonging to zone N.

The Nyiha language (Chinyiha or Cinyiha) is spoken in the far north-west corner of the district but also, in a form called Chinyika (which is described as a dialect of Chinyiha heavily influenced by Chitumbuka) further south around the village of Chisenga. Between these two, around the town of Chitipa itself, Lambya is dominant, although there are also pockets of speakers of Chinamwanga, Mambwe and Bemba. To the east of Chitipa, south of the Tanzanian border, live speakers of Chisukwa and Chindali. In the south of the district, Tumbuka is the main language. There are also a few Kyangonde speakers along the border with Karonga District.

References

External links 
Centre for Language Studies map of Northern Malawi Languages
University of Malawi Language Mapping Survey of Northern Malawi (2006)

 
Districts of Malawi
Districts in Northern Region, Malawi